Oakwood is a rural locality in the Bundaberg Region, Queensland, Australia.

Geography
Oakwood is bounded on the south by the Burnett River and on the west by Splitters Creek. The North Coast railway line forms its north-eastern border, but no railway stations serve the locality. 

Camp Island in the Burnett River is within the locality's borders.

The land use is mostly agricultural, involving irrigated cropping and some grazing. Unlike many farming areas near Bundaberg, sugarcane is growing in Oakwood but not as the predominant crop.

Climate
Oakwood has a subtropical climate with wet, hot summers and mild winters.  The annual rainfall of Oakwood is about 1010 mm. The most rain received by Oakwood in a day was 258 mm. The most rain received by Oakwood in a September day was around 125 mm.

History 

A church had been established by 1909 and had been offered to the Presbyterian Church on the condition they held regular services. Presbyterian services were conducted there until at least 1923. At some later time, the Methodist Church bought the church and replaced it with a new church in 1936. The Methodists operated the church until at least 1976.

Oakwood State School opened on 24 March 1924 under head teacher James Whalley.

Heritage listings

Oakwood has the following heritage listings:
 Splitters Creek Railway Bridge

Education 
Oakwood State School is a government primary (Prep-6) school for boys and girls at 125 Oakwood School Road. In 2017, the school had an enrolment of 101 students with  7 teachers (6 full-time equivalent) and 10 non-teaching staff (5 full-time equivalent). In 2018, the school had an enrolment of 115 students with 9 teachers (7 full-time equivalent) and 9 non-teaching staff (5 full-time equivalent).

There is no secondary school in Oakwood. The nearest government secondary school is Bundaberg North State High School in neighbouring Bundaberg North to the east.

Amenities
The Oakwood Community Church is a non-denominational church at 544 Gin Gin Road. It is affiliated with the Christian Community Churches of Australia. Oakwood's Queensland Country Women's Association hall is immediately adjacent to the west at 548 Gin Gin Road.

The Oakwood State School also serves as a place where the local families gather.

The Oakwood branch of the Queensland Country Women's Association meets at the Kenmore Library at the CWA Hall at 550 Mount Perry Road.

Sport
Oakwood Park Golf Club
Burnett Wide Bay Regional Appaloosa Club Inc: the club holds its meetings in the Oakwood QCWA Hall.

Tourism
Oakwood Caravan Park, provides accommodation with caravan berths and cabins for rent.

SSS Strawberries is a large strawberry farm that has a strawberry shop and opportunities to pick-your-own strawberries.

See also

References

External links

Bundaberg Region
Wide Bay–Burnett
Localities in Queensland